Scopula similata is a moth of the family Geometridae. It is found in the United Arab Emirates.

References

Moths described in 1924
similata
Moths of Asia